Petelinji zajtrk is a novel by Slovenian author Feri Lainšček. It was first published in 1999.

Content 
The novel follows a group of friends from the outskirts of the city who gather around the eccentric mechanic Gajaš. Here are the inn singer Malačiči, the melancholic professor of philosophy Batistula, the manager of the fleet Pavlica, the dentist with the significant surname Zobar and the owner of the local night scene Lepec. The lives of each of them are marked by helplessness and at the same time an unfavorable desire for change, the rudeness of speech and actions on the one hand, and romanticized, even more often eroticized longing on the other. Most often, however, their daily lives end with just a new bookmark on a long list of felt beer nights, in which they talk about justice and politics, about friendship and love. It is love, however, that dangerously complicates the fate of the mentioned group, when Gajaš's apprentice Dj, who falls in love with Lepč's wife Bronja, settles near them. An apprentice is also one who tells his or her love story.

See also
List of Slovenian novels

Slovenian novels
1999 novels